The Kedleston Madonna is a c.1529 oil on canvas painting by Parmigianino, now in the Kimbell Art Museum in Fort Worth, Texas, which acquired it from the Kedleston collection in the United Kingdom in 1995.

History
Stylistic and compositional features of the work date it to the artist's period in Bologna between 1527 and 1530 - the Christ Child's pose is reminiscent of that in his 1530 Santa Margherita Madonna, for example. This agrees with Vasari's Lives of the Artists, which states that in this period Parmigianino ""scattered around Bologna other Madonnas and small coloured and ornate paintings".

It was acquired from Marchese Arnaldi in Florence by William Kent for Nathaniel Curzon, 5th Baronet in 1758 and hung at the Curzon residence of Kedleston Hall, after which it is named. It passed through the Curzon family until being transferred to the trustees of the Kedleston Estate Trusts in 1987, who in turn sold it to its present owners in 1995. It was first attributed to Parmigianino in 1992 by Cecil Gould, an attribution accepted by all subsequent art historians.

References

1529 paintings
Paintings of the Madonna and Child by Parmigianino
Paintings in the collection of the Kimbell Art Museum